Sikan, Iran may refer to:
  Chaleh Siah, Ilam
  Hashemabad, Ilam